Xocalı (also, Khodzhalinskaya and Khozhalinskaya) is a village de jure in the Khojaly District of Azerbaijan, but is de facto part of Askeran province of the unrecognised Republic of Artsakh.

References 

Populated places in Khojaly District